HaMerotz LaMillion (lit. The Race to the Million) is an Israeli adventure reality game show based on the international Amazing Race franchise. Following the premise of other versions of the format, the show follows teams of two as they race around the world. Each season is split into legs, with teams tasked to deduce clues, navigate themselves in foreign areas, interact with locals, perform physical and mental challenges, and travel by air, boat, car, taxi, and other modes of transport. Teams are progressively eliminated at the end of most legs for being the last to arrive at designated Pit Stops. The first team to arrive at the Finish Line wins a grand prize of ₪1,000,000.

On 8 April 2008, Israeli TV network Reshet announced plans to produce a local version of the show. It premiered on 5 February 2009, on Channel 2. The show was produced by Reshet and, during its first four seasons, activeTV, which also produced the first four seasons of The Amazing Race Asia and the first two seasons of The Amazing Race Australia, in association with Disney-ABC and ESPN Television. It was originally hosted by Raz Meirman in the first season.

In April 2009, during the airing of the show, Reshet had begun preparations for a second season. They considered producing a celebrity edition of the show that would have raised the price of producing the show. Reshet had consulted with CBS and agreed it would film two more seasons at the same time to save expenses, a celebrity and non-celebrity editions. On 20 December however, Reshet announced that due to the overall high costs the show would not continue despite two seasons being in the planning stages. However, on 20 September 2010, Reshet reconsidered and announced a new season. On 11 February 2011, Ron Shahar was announced as the new host, replacing Raz Meirman. In October 2021, Shahar stated that a new season will be filmed as soon as it is safely possible due to the COVID-19 pandemic. On 17 October 2022, It was reported that a new season will be filming in 2023, will be produced by Keshet Media Group, and will be aired on Channel 12 with Yehuda Levi serving as the new host.

The Race
HaMerotz LaMillion is a reality television competition between two teams, in a race worldwide. Each season is divided into a number of legs wherein teams travel and complete various tasks to obtain clues to help them progress to a Pit Stop,  where teams are given a chance to rest and recover before starting the next leg. The last team to arrive is normally eliminated (except in non-elimination legs, where the last team to arrive may be penalized in the following leg). The final leg is run by the last three remaining teams, and the first to arrive at the final destination wins ₪1,000,000.

Teams

Each of the teams is composed of two individuals who have some type of relationship to each other.

Route Markers
Route Markers are yellow and red flags that mark the places where teams must go. Most Route Markers are attached to the boxes that contain clue envelopes, but some may mark the place where the teams must go in order to complete tasks, or may be used to line a course that the teams must follow. Route markers were, however, colored yellow and white in the third and fourth legs of Season 1, which took place in Vietnam, to avoid confusion with the flag of South Vietnam. During the Vietnamese leg in Season 5, the regular Route Marker was used.

Clues

Most clues are directly adopted from the original American version:
Route Info (סימן דרך – Siman Derech): A general clue that may include a task to be completed by the team before they can receive their next clue.
Detour (צומת – Tzomet ): A choice of two tasks. Teams are free to choose either task and swap tasks if they find one option too difficult.
Roadblock (מחסום – Machsom ): A task only one team member can complete. Teams must choose which member will complete the task based on a brief clue about the task before fully revealing the details of the task.
Fast Forward (קיצור דרך – Qitzur Derech ): A task that only one team may complete, allowing that team to skip all remaining tasks and head directly for the next Pit Stop. Teams may only claim one Fast Forward.
Double Battle (דו–קרב – Du-Qrav ): Introduced in Season 2, it is a task where two teams must compete against each other. In the Double Battle, the first team to arrive must wait for another team to perform a task. The team that wins the Double Battle will receive the next clue while the losing team would have to wait for the next team to redo the task. The cycle repeats until the last remaining team would have to wait out a penalty.

Obstacles

In addition to performing tasks, teams may encounter the following that could potentially slow them down:

Yield (עצור – Atzor ): It is where a team is forced to wait a pre-determined amount of time before continuing racing. 
U-Turn (סיבוב פרסה – Sibuv Parsa ): It is where a team is forced to return and complete the other option of the Detour they did not choose.

In Season 1, the Yield and U-Turn rules were similar to the original rules in the American version; The Yield and U-Turn only appeared sporadically and a single team can utilize their power to Yield/U-Turn another team at the Yield/U-Turn board only once.

In Season 2, a new rule regarding the Yield and U-turn was introduced. The Yield and U-Turn now appeared more often (almost every leg) and instead of a single team using their power to affect another team, all teams are now required to vote for the team they wish to Yield or U-turn (depending on the leg). Sometime during the leg, teams will encounter a board with their pictures. Here, they could choose from photographs of the teams and place the one they want to Yield/U-Turn below their pictures faced backwards. Sometime later in the leg, they would encounter another board where they would have to pull down their pictures on the board to reveal if they have been Yielded or U-Turned. The team/s with the most votes will receive the penalty. Teams that pull down their picture and get a red will get the penalty and the pictures of the teams that Yielded/U-Turned them. Those that get a green are free to continue racing.

In Season 3, the Double U-Turn was introduced. In addition to the rules above, the team that gets U-Turned is free to U-Turn another team of their choosing.

Intersection (מסלול משותף – Maslul Meshutaf ): Introduced in Season 3, two teams have to team up and complete further tasks together until they are informed that they are no longer Intersected. Teams are free to choose which team they want to partner with.

Legs
At the beginning of each leg, teams receive an allowance of cash to cover expenses during the legs (except for the purchase of airline tickets, which are paid-for by provided credit cards).

Teams then have to follow clues and Route Markers that will lead them to the various destinations and tasks they will face. Modes of travel between these destinations include commercial and chartered airplanes, boats, trains, taxis, buses, and rented vehicles provided by the show, or the teams may simply travel by foot. Each leg ends with a twelve-hour Pit Stop where teams are able to rest and where teams that arrive last are progressively eliminated until only three teams remain..

Differing from most of the other franchises of the series, the season finale is filmed as the program is being broadcast.

The Salvage Pass was awarded to the winners of the first leg of Season 3. This allowed that team to either save the last team to arrive on that leg from elimination or gain a lead in the next leg.
The Return Ticket was awarded to the team that finished first during a leg that consisted of previously eliminated teams in Season 6. This allowed the team that won it to return to the competition.

Non-elimination legs
Each season has a number of pre-determined non-elimination legs, in which the last team to arrive at the Pit Stop is not eliminated and is allowed to continue. There is no single elimination penalty in this version of the show:

Season 1
In the first leg, the team was forced to relinquish all of their money and belongings (except for passports and the clothes on their back) for the remainder of the season. In addition, they were not allotted money for the next leg and were not allowed to collect money until the next leg started for them.
In the seventh leg, the team was "Marked for Elimination"; if the team did not place first in the next leg, they would receive a 30-minute penalty.
Season 2
In the fourth and eleventh legs, the team had to perform a Speed Bump (פס האטה – Pas Heatah), a task only they must complete in the next leg.
In the sixth and ninth legs, the team was "Marked for Elimination"; if the team did not place first in the next leg, they would receive a 1-hour (leg 6) or 30-minute (leg 9) penalty.
Season 3
In the fifth leg, the team was required to wear their winter clothing for the duration of the next leg in the heat of Brazil.
In the seventh leg, the team that came last would have to wait an extra 30 minutes before departing on the next leg.
From Season 4 to Season 6 and in Season 8, no penalty was given to the affected team.
Season 7
In the first leg, the team would be on a flight that arrived two hours after the other teams landed in their first destination.

Rules and penalties
Most of the rules and penalties are adopted directly from the American edition, but in some cases, this version has been seen to have a unique set of additional rules.

Seasons

Countries and locales visited

, HaMerotz LaMillion has visited 50 countries and 6 continents.

Asia

North America

South America

Europe

Africa

Oceania

Notes

 Including the Special Administrative Regions of Hong Kong and Macau (1).
 Armenia and Georgia are geographically located in both Europe and Asia, but they are officially counted as in Asia.
 Including the constituent country of England (4).
 For one episode, 5 of the 8 first eliminated teams of Season 6 took part in a special separate leg of reward competitions taking place in Greece. 
 Includes 1 Finish Line.
 Includes 3 Finish Lines.

References

External links
Official website 

 
Channel 2 (Israeli TV channel) original programming
2009 Israeli television series debuts
2020 Israeli television series endings
Television series revived after cancellation
Israeli television series based on American television series
Television shows set in Africa
Television shows set in Asia
Television shows set in Europe
Television shows set in North America
Television shows set in Oceania
Television shows set in South America
Channel 13 (Israel) original programming
Channel 12 (Israel) original programming